A list of the films produced in Mexico in 1979 (see 1979 in film):

References

External links

1979
Films
Lists of 1979 films by country or language